McKenzie Lake is a lake in geographic Unwin Township in the Unorganized North Part of Sudbury District in northeastern Ontario, Canada. It is part of the Great Lakes Basin, and is just  from the border with the southwest corner of geographic Dufferin Township in Timiskaming District.

The lake has one unnamed inflow at the southwest. The primary outflow is an unnamed creek at the north which flows via Demott Creek, Silvester Creek, the Wanapitei River and the French River to Lake Huron.

See also
List of lakes in Ontario

References

Lakes of Timiskaming District